Paul Grimault (23 March 1905 – 29 March 1994) was one of the most important French animators. He made many traditionally animated films that were delicate in style, satirical, and lyrical in nature.

His most important work is Le Roi et l'oiseau, which ultimately took over 30 years to produce. He began it as La Bergère et le Ramoneur (The Shepherdess and the Chimney Sweep) in 1948 and it was highly anticipated, but Grimault's partner André Sarrut showed the film unfinished in 1952, against Grimault's wishes. This caused a rift between partners and a stop in production. In 1967, Grimault got possession of the film and subsequently was able to complete it in 1980 under a new title, Le Roi et l'oiseau, incorporating some footage from the original and re-hiring the original animators, together with some new, younger ones. There are many names for it in English that have been used in various releases, including: The King and the Bird (literal), The King and the Mockingbird, The Curious Adventures of Mr. Wonderbird and The King and Mr. Bird (1980).

He also collected his best shorts in a retrospective compilation movie, La table tournante (1988), which is included in the deluxe edition of Le Roi et l'oiseau. For a detailed bibliography, see this reference.

Les Gémeaux 
In 1936 Grimault founded, with André Sarrut, Les Gémeaux, which was the second significant French animation venture, following the work of Émile Cohl, which had closed years earlier. During World War II, Americans films being unavailable, its films found a captive audience. The studio produced a number of shorts, then closed its doors in 1952 following the expense of making La Bergère et le Ramoneur, which was the first feature-length French animated movie.

Other work 
Grimault was part of the agitprop group Groupe Octobre. At this group he met Jacques Prévert, with whom he went on to collaborate on several animated films, most notably Le roi et l'oiseau.

Filmography 

Grimault's filmography is as follows; those included in the retrospective La table tournante are marked with a star ("*").

Feature length:
 1952/1953 : La Bergère et le Ramoneur, disowned, incorporated into Le Roi et l'Oiseau
 1980 : Le Roi et l'Oiseau Received 1979 Louis Delluc Prize in December 1979, released in theaters on 19 March 1980
 1988 : La Table tournante, with Jacques Demy, collection of shorts
Named after the moving table in La séance de spiritisme (1931), which is the short that begins the collection.

Short:
 Monsieur Pipe fait de la peinture, 1936 (unfinished, film school)
 Les phénomènes électriques, 1937
 Le messager de la lumière, 1938 *
 L'enchanteur est enchanté, 1938
 Les passagers de "La Grande Ourse", 1939–1941 (originally Gô chez les oiseaux (Gô among the birds), 1939)*
 Le marchand de notes, 1942 *
 La Machine à explorer le temps, 1942 (unfinished)
 L’épouvantail, 1943 *
 Le voleur de paratonnerres, 1944 *
 Niglo reporter, 1945 (unfinished)
 La flûte magique, 1946 *
 Le petit Soldat, 1947 * (International prize, Venice Biennial 1948, Grand Prix of the Prague and Rio festivals, 1950)
 La Légende de la soie, 1950 * (short for the silk industry)
 Pierres oubliées, 1952
 Enrico cuisinier, 1956 (mixed with live action, with Pierre Prévert)
 La faim du monde (ou La faim dans le monde), 1957/58 (re-edited version for children, Le Monde en raccourci, 1975)
 Le petit Claus et le grand Claus, 1964
 Le diamant, 1970 * with Jacques Prevert, complement to L'Aveu of Costa-Gavras
 Le chien mélomane, 1973 * with Jacques Prevert
 Le fou du Roi, 1987–1988 * (made for La Table Tournante)

Commercials:
 Le Messenger de la Lumière (The Messenger of Light) – for a light shop
 La Légende de la Soie (The Legend of Silk) – paid for by the silk industry
 Sain et Sauf (Safe and Sound) – for Danon yogurt
 Terre! (Land ho!) – for an optician

Other work:
 La séance de spiritisme (The spiritualist seance) (1931, live action advertisement by Jean Aurenche with stop-action animation by Grimault and Jacques Brunius)
 Two animated TV pilots (Chasseurs pécheurs and Les Sportifs de la Préhistoire), 1970
 Animated sequences projected during the show C'est la guerre, Monsieur Gruber (It's war, Mister Gruber) by Jacques Sternberg, at the Odeon theater, during the Comédie-Française

Legacy
 Hayao Miyazaki said he was inspired by Grimault's work.

References

External links
Paul Grimault, Traits de mémoire, Éditions du Seuil, 1991; preface by Jean-Pierre Pagliano – Grimault's autobiography 
La Table tournante de Paul Grimault et Jacques Demy (1988)

Excellent dedicated site

French animators
French film directors
French animated film directors
French animated film producers
People from Neuilly-sur-Seine
1905 births
1994 deaths
Commandeurs of the Ordre des Arts et des Lettres
César Honorary Award recipients